Anthony Hamilton (born April 14, 1980) is an American mixed martial artist who most recently competed in the Heavyweight division. A professional competitor since 2010, Hamilton has also formerly competed for the UFC, MFC, and was the MFC inaugural Heavyweight Champion.

Background
Originally from Kent, Washington, Hamilton competed in wrestling and football growing up, graduating from Kentwood High School, then attending Highline College, where he earned NJCAA All-American honors in wrestling. He later attended Central Washington University.

Mixed martial arts career

Early career
Hamilton went undefeated during his amateur career (4-0) before turning professional in October 2010. Prior to signing with the UFC, Hamilton competed for the Maximum Fighting Championship, claiming their inaugural heavyweight championship after defeating Smealinho Rama at MFC 38: Behind Enemy Lines on October 4, 2013. He defended the title once by defeating Ultimate Fighter 10 contestant Darrill Schoonover at MFC 39: No Remorse on January 17, 2014.

Hamilton signed with the UFC in early 2014.

Ultimate Fighting Championship
In his promotional debut, Hamilton faced Alexey Oleynik at UFC Fight Night: Swanson vs. Stephens. He lost the fight via neck crank submission in the first round.

In his second appearance, Hamilton faced Ruan Potts at UFC 177 on August 30, 2014. He won the fight via TKO in the second round.

Hamilton next faced Todd Duffee at UFC 181 on December 6, 2014. He lost the fight via KO in the first round.

Hamilton faced Daniel Omielańczuk on April 11, 2015 at UFC Fight Night 64. Hamilton won the fight by unanimous decision (29–28, 29–28, and 29–27).

Hamilton was expected to face Derrick Lewis on October 3, 2015 at UFC 192. However, Hamilton was pulled from the fight and replaced by Viktor Pešta. In turn, Hamilton was rescheduled to face Mirko Cro Cop on November 28, 2015 at UFC Fight Night 79. However on November 10, it was announced that Filipović had pulled out of the fight and abruptly announced his retirement. Subsequently, UFC officials removed Hamilton from the card and announced that he would be rescheduled for another event.

Hamilton faced Shamil Abdurakhimov on February 21, 2016 at UFC Fight Night 83. He lost the fight by unanimous decision.

Hamilton faced Damian Grabowski on July 30, 2016 at UFC 201. He won the fight via knockout just 14 seconds into the first round.

Hamilton faced Francis Ngannou on December 9, 2016 at UFC Fight Night 102. He lost the fight via submission in the first round.

Hamilton faced promotional newcomer Marcel Fortuna on February 4, 2017 at UFC Fight Night 104. He lost the fight by knockout in the first round.

Hamilton faced Daniel Spitz on September 16, 2017 at UFC Fight Night: Rockhold vs. Branch. He lost the fight via TKO in the first round in 24 seconds.

Hamilton announced his retirement from professional MMA fighting on his social network after his loss to Splitz on September 16, 2017 at UFC Fight Night: Rockhold vs. Branch.

Shortly after his announced from retirement, he was called to replace Dmitrii Smolyakov to face promotional newcomer Adam Wieczorek on October 21, 2017 at UFC Fight Night: Cowboy vs. Till. However, the bout was scratched a day before the event due to "safety concerns," as a few Lechia Gdańsk ultras – extreme and sometimes violent supporters of the local football team – showed up just prior to the weigh-ins. Wieczorek is a supporter of Ruch Chorzów, a Lechia Gdańsk rival team. The fighters were absent from ceremonial weigh-ins due to that reason, but the bout was eventually canceled and rescheduled for UFC Fight Night: Werdum vs. Tybura a month later. Hamilton lost the bout by unanimous decision.

Post-UFC
After four consecutive losses, Hamilton was released from the UFC. In 2018, Hamilton returned to the regional circuit, and is 3-1 since his departure from the Las Vegas-based promotion.

Hamilton faced Rizvan Kuniev for the EFC Heavyweight Championship at Eagle FC 46 on March 11, 2022. After getting hit in the body by knees, Hamilton soon after lost the bout due to guillotine choke in the first round.

Championships and accomplishments
 UFC
 Fourth-fastest KO in the Heavyweight division (14 seconds) 
 Maximum Fighting Championship
 MFC Heavyweight Championship (One time)
 One Successful Championship Defense
 CageSport
 CS Heavyweight Championship (One time)
 One Successful Championship Defense

Mixed martial arts record

|-
|Win
|align=center|19–11
|Juan Figueroa
|TKO (punches)
|MMA Supreme Showdown 7
|
|align=center|3
|align=center|1:27
|Tulalip Bay, Washington, United States
|
|-
|Loss
|align=center|18–11
| Rizvan Kuniev
| Submission (guillotine choke)
| Eagle FC 46
| 
| align=center|1
| align=center|1:17
| Miami, Florida, United States
| 
|-
|Loss
|align=center|18–10
|Vladimir Dayneko
|TKO (punches)
|EFC 40
|
|align=center|1
|align=center|2:56
|Almetyevsk, Russia
|
|-
|Win
|align=center|18–9
|Jared Torgeson
|Decision (unanimous)
|CageSport 55 
|
|align=center|3
|align=center|5:00
|Tacoma, Washington, United States
|
|-
|Win
|align=center|17–9
|Dylan Potter
|Decision (unanimous)
|Dominate FC 2
|
|align=center|3
|align=center|5:00
|Tacoma, Washington, United States
|
|-
|Win
|align=center|16–9
|Randy Zarza
|Submission (rear-naked choke)
|COGA 61: Rumble on the Ridge 41
|
|align=center|2
|align=center|1:49
|Snoqualmie, Washington, United States
|
|-
|Loss
|align=center|15–9
|Adam Wieczorek
|Decision (unanimous)
|UFC Fight Night: Werdum vs. Tybura
|
|align=center|3
|align=center|5:00
|Sydney, Australia
|
|-
|Loss
|align=center|15–8
|Daniel Spitz
|TKO (punches)
|UFC Fight Night: Rockhold vs. Branch 
|
|align=center|1
|align=center|0:24
|Pittsburgh, Pennsylvania, United States
|
|-
|Loss
|align=center|15–7
|Marcel Fortuna
|KO (punch)
|UFC Fight Night: Bermudez vs. The Korean Zombie
|
|align=center|1
|align=center|3:10
|Houston, Texas, United States
| 
|-
|Loss
|align=center|15–6
|Francis Ngannou
|Submission (kimura)
|UFC Fight Night: Lewis vs. Abdurakhimov
|
|align=center|1
|align=center|1:57
|Albany, New York, United States
|
|-
|Win
|align=center|15–5
|Damian Grabowski
|KO (punches)
|UFC 201 
|
|align=center|1
|align=center|0:14
|Atlanta, Georgia, United States
|
|-
|Loss
|align=center|14–5
|Shamil Abdurakhimov
|Decision (unanimous)
|UFC Fight Night: Cowboy vs. Cowboy
|
|align=center|3
|align=center|5:00
|Pittsburgh, Pennsylvania, United States
| 
|-
|Win
|align=center|14–4
|Daniel Omielańczuk
|Decision (unanimous)
|UFC Fight Night: Gonzaga vs. Cro Cop 2
|
|align=center|3
|align=center|5:00
|Kraków, Poland
|
|-
|Loss
|align=center|13–4
|Todd Duffee
|KO (punch)
|UFC 181
|
|align=center|1
|align=center|0:33
|Las Vegas, Nevada, United States
|
|-
|Win
|align=center|13–3
|Ruan Potts
|TKO (body punches)
|UFC 177
|
|align=center|2
|align=center|4:17
|Sacramento, California, United States
|
|-
|Loss
|align=center|12–3
|Alexey Oleynik
|Submission (scarf-hold headlock)
|UFC Fight Night: Swanson vs. Stephens
|
|align=center|1
|align=center|2:18
|San Antonio, Texas, United States
|
|-
|Win
|align=center|12–2
|Darrill Schoonover
|Decision (unanimous)
|MFC 39: No Remorse
|
|align=center|5
|align=center|5:00
|Edmonton, Alberta, Canada
|
|-
|Win
|align=center|11–2
|Smealinho Rama
|KO (head kick)
|MFC 38: Behind Enemy Lines
|
|align=center|2
|align=center|0:12
|Edmonton, Alberta, Canada
|
|-
|Win
|align=center|10–2
|Matt Kovacs
|TKO (punches)
|CageSport 26
|
|align=center|1
|align=center|2:14
|Tacoma, Washington, United States
|
|-
|Win
|align=center|9–2
|Will Courchaine
|Submission (armbar)
|Rumble on the Ridge 27
|
|align=center|1
|align=center|1:37
|Snoqualmie, Washington, United States
|
|-
|Win
|align=center|8–2
|Bill Widler
|TKO (punches)
|CageSport 22
|
|align=center|1
|align=center|0:38
|Fife, Washington, United States
|
|-
|Win
|align=center|7–2
|Mike Riddell
|KO (punch)
|Rumble on the Ridge 26
|
|align=center|1
|align=center|0:07
|Snoqualmie, Washington, United States
|
|-
|Loss
|align=center|6–2
|Fabiano Scherner
|Submission (arm-triangle choke)
|SportFight 31: Battle at the Bay 2
|
|align=center|1
|align=center|2:02
|Manson, Washington, United States
|
|-
|Loss
|align=center|6–1
|Walt Harris
|KO (punches)
|SCC 4: Grove vs. Silva
|
|align=center|1
|align=center|1:15
|Las Vegas, Nevada, United States
|
|-
|Win
|align=center|6–0
|Matt Kovacs
|TKO (punches)
|Rumble on the Ridge 21
|
|align=center|2
|align=center|N/A
|Snoqualmie, Washington, United States
|
|-
|Win
|align=center|5–0
|Rath Cyrus
|Decision (unanimous)
|Rumble on the Ridge 20
|
|align=center|3
|align=center|5:00
|Snoqualmie, Washington, United States
|
|-
|Win
|align=center|4–0
|Josh Bennett
|TKO (punches)
|Rumble on the Ridge 19
|
|align=center|3
|align=center|3:33
|Snoqualmie, Washington, United States
|
|-
|Win
|align=center|3–0
|Jesus Rodriguez
|Decision (unanimous)
|Rumble on the Ridge 18
|
|align=center|3
|align=center|5:00
|Snoqualmie, Washington, United States
|
|-
|Win
|align=center|2–0
|Jared Torgeson
|Decision (unanimous)
|CageSport 13
|
|align=center|3
|align=center|5:00
|Tacoma, Washington, United States
|
|-
|Win
|align=center|1–0
|Kyle Welch
|Decision (unanimous)
|CageSport 12
|
|align=center|3
|align=center|5:00
|Tacoma, Washington, United States
|

See also
 List of current UFC fighters
 List of male mixed martial artists

References

External links
 
 

Living people
1980 births
American male mixed martial artists
Heavyweight mixed martial artists
Mixed martial artists utilizing collegiate wrestling
Mixed martial artists utilizing Brazilian jiu-jitsu
Mixed martial artists from Washington (state)
Sportspeople from Kent, Washington
Ultimate Fighting Championship male fighters
American practitioners of Brazilian jiu-jitsu
People awarded a black belt in Brazilian jiu-jitsu
American male sport wrestlers
Amateur wrestlers
Highline College alumni